Glenea despecta is a species of beetle in the family Cerambycidae. It was described by Francis Polkinghorne Pascoe in 1858. It is known from Sumatra, Borneo and Vietnam.

References

despecta
Beetles described in 1858